Jeroen Slaghekke (born 3 May 1992 at The Hague, Netherlands) is a Dutch racing driver.  He finished 3rd in the Suzuki Swift Cup Netherlands in 2009 and was the 2011 vice-champion in the British Formula Ford Championship.

Racing career

Netherlands
Jeroen started his motorsport career in go-karts in 2007, Racing in the Dutch RK-1 4 stroke karting championship. Slaghekke then moved up to touring cars in 2008 where he raced in the Suzuki Swift Cup Netherlands for the Coronel Junior Team run by Tom Coronel.

2009 saw Slaghekke race a second year in Suzuki Swift Cup Netherlands with the Coronel Junior Team, in which he finished 3rd overall with 170 points.

International
Slaghekke joined the Jamun Racing Services team to compete in the 2010 British Formula Ford season in Great Britain. He enjoyed a maiden success in the series with a podium finish at Donington Park.

For 2011 Slaghekke returned to the UK to compete in the British Formula Ford Championship for a second year.  Racing a Mygale for British team Jamun Racing Services he won 4 races, took 21 podiums, 8 pole positions and 7 fastest racing laps. He also holds the Formula Ford lap record for the Silverstone National Circuit, standing at 58.200 seconds, and the Silverstone Circuit standing at 2.08.182.

In 2012 Slaghekke raced in Formula Renault 2.0 Northern European Cup for Van Amersfoort Racing and finished fourth in points with a runner-up finish in his home race at Circuit Park Zandvoort and a win at Autodrom Most.

In 2013 Slaghekke signed on with Cape Motorsports to race in the American U.S. F2000 National Championship. Slaghekke left the team after three rounds of the championship and joined Afterburner Autosport. He made appearances in two more rounds (5 starts) before leaving the series for the rest of the season. He finished 22nd in points with a best finish of eighth. In 2014 Slaghekke returned to the series with Afterburner. He switched teams after four rounds (seven races) to Belardi Auto Racing where he completed the season. He improved to 13th in points with a best finish of fourth on the oval at Lucas Oil Raceway at Indianapolis, his final start with Afterburner.

Racing record

American open–wheel racing results
(key) (Races in bold indicate pole position) (Races in italics indicate fastest lap)

U.S. F2000 National Championship

References

External links
 British Formula Ford Championship 

 

1992 births
Living people
Dutch racing drivers
Formula Renault 2.0 NEC drivers
Sportspeople from The Hague
U.S. F2000 National Championship drivers
Belardi Auto Racing drivers
Wayne Taylor Racing drivers
Van Amersfoort Racing drivers